"Lottovoitto" (in English: "Lottery Win") is a song by Finnish recording artist Maija Vilkkumaa, released by Warner Music Finland on 1 March 2010, as the first single from her sixth studio album Kunnes joet muuttaa suuntaa. Written and composed by Vilkkumaa, the song spent five weeks on the Finnish Singles Chart, peaking at number 15.

Track listing and formats
Digital download

References

External links
Official music video for "Lottovoitto" at YouTube

2010 singles
Maija Vilkkumaa songs
Songs written by Maija Vilkkumaa
2010 songs
Warner Music Finland singles